Willington is an area in the North Tyneside district, in the county of Tyne and Wear, England. It has an industrial estate.

The place-name derives from Old English tun (homestead or farm) of Wifel's people, and appears in 1085 as Wiflintun, and as Wiuelington in 1204.

References

Populated places in Tyne and Wear
Wallsend